"Tonight" is a 1990 song recorded by the American pop band New Kids on the Block. It was their third single from their 1990 album Step by Step. It was a big hit on both sides of the Atlantic. It first reached #7 on the U.S. Billboard Hot 100 (becoming their 9th and last top 10),  and then went on to reach #3 on the UK Singles Chart soon after its American success, giving the band another hit, as, at this point, they were at their commercial peak.

The song is "half slow tempo, half ska" and is mostly sung in unison by all five members of the group until the "la la..." section of the chorus. The song "discusses the relationship that binds the members of the group to their fans, since the beginning", with many references to their earlier hits in the first couplet.

The "ska part" is the melody of Johann Sebastians Bach's Cantate "Sleepers awake" (BWV 140). At times, the song reminds of the Beatles' compositive style of Penny Lane and Magical Mystery Tour.

Track listings
US and Canada 7-inch single
"Tonight" - 3:27 
"Hold On" - 3:36

 7" single / 7" single - Picture disc
 "Tonight" — 3:26
 "Hold on" — 3:36

 12" maxi / CD maxi
 "Tonight" — 3:27
 "Hold on" — 3:36
 "Don't Give Up on Me" — 4:45

Versions
"Tonight" [Album Version] - 3:30
"Tonight" [Remix] - 3:29
"Tonight" [12" Version] - 4:47
"Tonight" [Video Version] - 3:11

Charts

Weekly charts

Year-end charts

Certifications and sales

References

External links
Official video

1990 singles
New Kids on the Block songs
Columbia Records singles
Songs written by Maurice Starr
Song recordings produced by Maurice Starr
1990 songs